Almondo is both a given name and a surname. Notable people with the name include:

Almondo Curry (born 1980), American football player
Almondo Fiori, American radio personality
Almondo Sewell (born 1987), American football player
Mario Almondo (born 1964), Italian engineer